Popular sovereignty is the principle that the authority of a state and its government are created and sustained by the consent of its people, who are the source of all political power.  Popular sovereignty, being a principle, does not imply any particular political implementation. Benjamin Franklin expressed the concept when he wrote that "In free governments, the rulers are the servants and the people their superiors and sovereigns".

Origins

Popular sovereignty in its modern sense is an idea that dates to the social contract school represented by Thomas Hobbes (1588–1679), John Locke (1632–1704), and Jean-Jacques Rousseau (1712–1778). Rousseau authored a book titled The Social Contract, a prominent political work that highlighted the idea of the "general will". The central tenet of popular sovereignty is that the legitimacy of a government's authority and of its laws is based on the consent of the governed. Hobbes, Locke, and Rousseau all held that individuals enter into a social contract, voluntarily giving up some of their natural freedom, so as to secure protection from the dangers inherent in the freedom of others. Whether men are seen as naturally more prone to violence and rapine (Hobbes) or to cooperation and kindness (Rousseau), the idea that a legitimate social order emerges only when liberties and duties are equal among citizens binds the social contract thinkers to the concept of popular sovereignty.

An earlier development of the theory of popular sovereignty is found among the School of Salamanca (see e.g. Francisco de Vitoria (1483–1546) or Francisco Suarez (1548–1617)). Like the theorists of the divine right of kings and Locke, the Salamancans saw sovereignty as emanating originally from God. However, unlike the divine right theorists and in agreement with Locke, they saw it as passing from God to all people equally, not only to monarchs.

Republics and popular monarchies are theoretically based on popular sovereignty. However, a legalistic notion of popular sovereignty does not necessarily imply an effective, functioning democracy. A party or even an individual dictator may claim to represent the will of the people and rule in its name, which would be congruent with Hobbes's view on the subject. Most modern definitions present democracy as a necessary condition of popular sovereignty.

United States

The application of the doctrine of popular sovereignty receives particular emphasis in American history, notes historian Christian G. Fritz's American Sovereigns: The People and America's Constitutional Tradition Before the Civil War, a study of the early history of American constitutionalism. In describing how Americans attempted to apply this doctrine prior to the territorial struggle over slavery that led to the Civil War, political scientist Donald S. Lutz noted the variety of American applications:

The American Revolution marked a departure in the concept of popular sovereignty as it had been discussed and employed in the European historical context. American revolutionaries aimed to substitute the sovereignty in the person of King George III, with a collective sovereign—composed of the people. Thenceforth, American revolutionaries generally agreed with and were committed to the principle that governments were legitimate only if they rested on popular sovereignty – that is, the sovereignty of the people. This was often linked with the notion of the consent of the governed—the idea of the people as a sovereign—and had clear 17th- and 18th-century intellectual roots in English history.

1850s

In the 1850s, in the run-up to the Civil War, Northern Democrats led by Senator Lewis Cass of Michigan and Stephen A. Douglas of Illinois promoted popular sovereignty as a middle position on the slavery issue. It said that actual residents of territories should be able to decide by voting whether or not slavery would be allowed in the territory. The federal government did not have to make the decision, and by appealing to democracy, Cass and Douglas hoped they could finesse the question of support for or opposition to slavery. Douglas applied popular sovereignty to Kansas in the Kansas-Nebraska Act, which passed Congress in 1854. The Act had two unexpected results. By dropping the Missouri Compromise of 1820 (which said slavery would never be allowed in Kansas), it was a major boost for the expansion of slavery. Overnight, outrage united anti-slavery forces across the North into an "anti-Nebraska" movement that soon was institutionalized as the Republican Party, with its firm commitment to stop the expansion of slavery. Secondly, pro- and anti-slavery elements moved into Kansas with the intention of voting slavery up or down, leading to a raging state-level civil war, known as "Bleeding Kansas". Abraham Lincoln targeted popular sovereignty in the Lincoln–Douglas debates of 1858, leaving Douglas in a position that alienated Southern pro-slavery Democrats who thought he was too weak in his support of slavery. The Southern Democrats broke off and ran their own candidate against Lincoln and Douglas in 1860.

See also
 Claim of Right 1989
 Consent of the governed
 Self-determination
 Self-governance
 Declaration of Arbroath
 Legitimacy (political)
 Man-made law
 Parliamentary sovereignty
 Philosophical anarchism
 Retroversion of the sovereignty to the people
 Scottish Constitutional Commission
 Sovereign Citizen Movement

Notes

References
 Adams, Willi Paul (1980), The First American Constitutions: Republican Ideology and the Making of the State Constitutions in the Revolutionary Era, University of North Carolina Press, 
 Childers, Christopher (March 2011), "Interpreting Popular Sovereignty: A Historiographical Essay", Civil War History 57 (1): 48–70
 Conkin, Paul K. (1974),  Self-Evident Truths: Being a Discourse on the Origins & Development of the First Principles of American Government—Popular Sovereignty, Natural Rights, and Balance & Separation of Powers, Indiana University Press,  
 Lutz, Donald S. (1980), Popular Consent and Popular Control: Whig Political Theory in the Early State Constitutions, Louisiana State Univ. Press, 
 Lutz, Donald S. (1988), The Origins of American Constitutionalism, Louisiana State University Press,  
 Morgan, Edmund S. (1977), "The Problem of Popular Sovereignty", Aspects of American Liberty: Philosophical, Historical and Political (The American Philosophical Society)
 Morgan, Edmund S. (1988), Inventing the People: The Rise of Popular Sovereignty in England and America, W.W. Norton and Company, 
 Peters, Jr., Ronald M. (1978) The Massachusetts Constitution of 1780: A Social Compact, University of Massachusetts Press, 
 Reid, John Phillip (1986–1993), American Revolution III (4 volumes ed.), University of Wisconsin Press, 
 Silbey, Joel H., ed. (1994), "Constitutional Conventions", Encyclopedia of the American Legislative System (3 volumes ed.) (Charles Scribner's Sons) I, 
 Tarcov, Nathan (1986), "Popular Sovereignty (in Democratic Political Theory)", in Levy, Leonard, Encyclopedia of the American Constitution 3,

Further reading
 
  links it to Jacksonian Democracy
 .

 
Politics of Scotland
Constitution of the United Kingdom
Jean-Jacques Rousseau